The 1905 News of the World Match Play was the third News of the World Match Play tournament. It was played from Tuesday 3 to Thursday 5 October at Walton Heath Golf Club. 32 players competed in a straight knock-out competition, with each match contested over 18 holes, except for the final which was over 36 holes. The winner received £100 out of a total prize fund of £240. James Braid defeated Tom Vardon 4 & 3 in the final to win the tournament.

Qualification
Entry was restricted to members of the Professional Golfers' Association (PGA). Qualification was by a series of 36-hole stroke-play competitions; one for each of the six PGA sections. The Southern section had 16 qualifiers, the Midland and Northern sections had 5 each, the Scottish section 3, the Irish section 2 and the Welsh section 1. In the event of a tie for places there was a playoff. Compared to 1904 one entry was allocated to the new Welsh section with the number of qualifiers from the Northern section being reduced to five.

The qualifiers were:

Irish section: Tom Hood, Fred Smyth
Midland section: George Cawsey, John Hutchings, Willie Lewis, Billy Whiting, Tom Williamson
Northern section: George Duncan, Sandy Herd, Percy Hills, David McEwan, Bertie Snowball
Southern section: James Braid, George Carter, Harry Cawsey, James Hepburn, Rowland Jones, Arthur Mitchell, Wilfrid Reid, Ernest Riseborough, Jack Rowe, Ralph Smith, J.H. Taylor, Alfred Toogood, Harry Vardon, Tom Vardon, William Webb, Jack White
Scottish section: Jock Hutchison, Andrew Kirkaldy, Arnaud Massy
Welsh section: Fred Collins

Format
The format was unchanged. Matches were over 18 holes except for the final which was over 36 holes. Extra holes were played in the event of a tied match. Two rounds were played on the first day, two more on the second day with the final on the third day.

Results
Source:

w/o = Walk over
scr = Scratched

Prize money
The winner received £100 and a gold medal, the runner-up £30 and a silver medal, the losing semi-finalists £15 and a bronze medal, while the third round losers received £10 and the second round losers received £5.

References

Golf tournaments in England
News of the World Match Play
News of the World Match Play
October 1905 sports events